was a Japanese role-playing video game developed by FuRyu. It was released in Japan on October 23, 2017 for Android and iOS devices. The game's service ended on August 6, 2019. An anime television series adaptation by Project No.9 aired from January 8 to March 26, 2019.

Plot
In the year 20XX, manga and anime culture has been gradually disappearing from Akihabara. This is the result of a mysterious malicious virus that infects the worlds of various fictional works and destroys them, along with anyone's memories of them. Standing against this are the members of the Rabbit Shed Shop café, who possess the ability to travel into these worlds in order to stop the virus.

Characters

An energetic and positive high school girl who is childhood friends with the manager of The Rabbit Hut Headquarters and a self-proclaimed "in-training." She's inquisitive about anything and everything, and is able to be friends with just about anybody.

She's very smart and full of knowledge, but a bit shy. She's a first-rate cosplayer, and really likes mushrooms for some reason.

A girl from Russia who can speak fluent Japanese. She's very strict and stubborn, and likes Japan and military paraphernalia.

The daughter of a rich family who is skilled in her studies, as well as martial arts and the fine arts. She is somewhat of an elitist anime fan, but is very kind to her friends.

A girl who loves pity and is lovable, emotional, cat-like. Maid clothes have a strong commitment and have the ability to become friends with anyone immediately.

A mysterious and mature girl who likes making clothes for her dolls. Her behavior can't be read ahead because her emotions aren't exposed.

The fostering game that has a very kind and homely atmosphere is a hobbyist , big character, and everyone's mother role 520 which is not often serious or angry.

A serious, polite, and historical nerd girl who speaks in honor of anyone. Some cowards can starve when fear reach her limits.

A hot-blooded girl who loves boy cartoons and tackles everything with full power. It has a very high physical ability, but it has a hot but contagious and weak side.

A girl with a cool character who usually likes to make Kubo lily coupler model and is usually slammed. There are many things to hide her true spirit, there is also a shy side.

It's kind of stupid, but always a smile and everyone's mood maker. Who's hobbies are taking pictures with her camera.

 An optimistic, natural and tender girl. Who is an inventor and a young genius doctor who produces an invention that surpasses wisdom.

A talking rabbit with a screw in his head, nicknamed "NejiUsa" for short.

The main antagonist of the series, who travels to the worlds of various series in order to spread viruses and destroy them.

Anime
An anime television series adaptation by Project No.9 was announced, and it aired from January 8 to March 26, 2019 on Tokyo MX, Sun TV, KBS, and BS Fuji. Asami Imai performed the series' opening theme, "Believe in Sky," and Iketeru Hearts performed the series' ending theme, "Sparkle☆Power." The series is licensed by Sentai Filmworks and is simulcast on its Hidive streaming service. The series ran for 12 episodes. Following decisions by the production committee, speculated to be related to the show's parody of Is the Order a Rabbit? in the first two episodes, the first episode was replaced with a revised version on March 26, 2019 while the second episode was removed from streaming services on the same day. A Blu-ray disc boxset, containing all episodes except the second, was released on June 5, 2019.

Notes

References

External links
 
Official anime website 

2017 video games
2019 anime television series debuts
Android (operating system) games
Anime television series based on video games
FuRyu games
IOS games
Japan-exclusive video games
Manga based on video games
Media Factory manga
Project No.9
Role-playing video games
Seinen manga
Sentai Filmworks
Video games developed in Japan